The Battle of Kiev of January 1918 was a Bolshevik military operation of Petrograd and Moscow Red Guard formations directed to capture the capital of Ukraine. The operation was led by Red Guards commander Mikhail Artemyevich Muravyov as part of the Soviet expeditionary force against Kaledin and the Central Council of Ukraine. The storming of Kiev (Kyiv) took place during the ongoing peace negotiations at Brest-Litovsk on February 5–8, 1918 (January 23–26, old style). The operation resulted in the occupation of the city by Bolshevik troops on February 9 and the evacuation of the Ukrainian government to Zhytomyr.

Background
In the 1918 Battle of Kiev the aim of the undeclared war by Soviet Russia was to install Soviet power in Ukraine. During the winter of 1917/18 the revolutionary formations of Russia installed Soviet power in governorates of Kharkiv, Katerynoslav, and Poltava. Kiev was next. The general command directed onto Kiev was under the command of Mikhail Muravyov. On January 27, 1918 the government of Ukraine announced Kiev under a siege and appointed Mykhailo Kovenko as the military commandant of the city's defence. With the approach of the advancing Soviet forces the city's Bolsheviks instigated an uprising at the Arsenal factory, which was extinguished in seven days on February 4, 1918. The Bolshevik protest in the city greatly eased the advancement of the Soviet forces, drawing several Ukrainian formations out of adjacent provinces. The Kiev garrison was greatly demoralized by Bolshevik propaganda and Soviet advances across the territory of Ukraine. Ukrainian regiments were depleted, and some either announced their neutrality or were eager to side with the Bolsheviks.

Bolshevik forces attacked the city from Bakhmach and Lubny. On February 8, the Ukrainian government was forced to abandon the city. On February 9 General Muravyov took control of the city and instituted a reign of terror of brutal reprisals against Kiev's population that would last twenty days.

Aftermath 
On same the day Bolshevik forces captured Kiev, the Central Rada signed a treaty with the Central Powers. Ukrainian People's Army forces under Symon Petliura, along with German and Austro-Hungarian troops, would retake Kiev on March 1. The Bolshevik government recognized Ukraine's independence on March 3. Subsequently, during May to October 1918, peace negotiations were held between Russia and Ukraine.

Order of battle

Muravyov Forces
 Commander in Chief Mikhail Artemyevich Muravyov
 1st Army Colonel Pavel Yegorov
 2nd Army Colonel Reingold Berzin

List of formations
 Red Guards of Bryansk 800 soldiers / Russians
 Red Guards of Moscow (Moscow river neighborhood) 200 soldiers / Latvians/ Russians
 Red Guards of Kharkiv 500 soldiers / Jews/ Russians
 Donbas Red Guards of Dmitry Zhloba 300 soldiers / Russians/ Ukrainians/ Jews
 Red Guards of Putilov Factory 60 soldiers / Jews/Russians/ Ukrainians
 1st Petrograd Red Guard formation 1,000 soldiers / Latvians/ Russians
 Red Guards of Petrograd (Moscow district) 500 soldiers / Latvians/ Russians
 Kharkiv Red Guards of Aleksandr Belenkovich 150 soldiers / Jews/ Russians/ Ukrainians
 Red Cossacks of Vitaly Markovich Primakov 198 soldiers / Russians/ Ukrainians
 Bryansk battery 92 soldiers / Russians
 Armoured train of Moscow 100 soldiers / Russians
 Red Guards formations of local settlements / Jews/ Russians
 Underground workers of Arsenal (Cave monastery) / Russians/ Ukrainians
Composition by nationality: Russians - 88%; Jews - 7%; Ukrainians - 5%

Ukrainian Forces
 City commandant Mykhailo Kovenko
 Haidamaka Host of Sloboda Ukraine Symon Petliura—400 soldiers
 2nd Cadet School Battalion—110 "Black Haidamakas"
 Free Cossacks formations
 Artillery division—3 batteries
 Sich Riflemen of Halych Battalion Yevhen Konovalets—500 soldiers
 Doroshenko Regiment—200 soldiers
 Remnants of Bohdaniv Regiment Oleksandr Shapoval

References

External links
 1918 Chronicles. Institute of History of Ukraine.
 War between Russia and Ukraine in 1917-18. Institute of History of Ukraine
 War between Bolsheviks and the government of Ukraine in 1917-18. Military Literature.
 Great Britain. Parliament. The parliamentary debates from the year 1803 to the present time.
 Battle for Kiev: Petliura against Muravyov

1918 in Ukraine
Kiev 1918
Ukrainian People's Republic
February 1918 events
Kiev
1910s in Kyiv